The 1991 Pittsburg State Gorillas football team was an American football team that won the 1991 NCAA Division II national championship.

The team represented Pittsburg State University as a member of the Missouri Intercollegiate Athletic Association (MIAA) during the 1991 NCAA Division II football season. In their second season under head coach Chuck Broyles, the Gorillas compiled a 13–1–1 record (8–0–1 against conference opponents), won the MIAA championship, and outscored opponents by a total of 555 to 226.  They qualified to participate in the Division II playoffs and advanced to the national championship game, defeating Jacksonville State by a 23–6 score. It was Pittsburg State's third national championship.

Wide receiver and return specialist Ronnie West received the Harlon Hill Trophy as the best player in Division II football.

The season was the 84th for Pittsburg State competing in football and its third as a member of NCAA Division II. The team played its home games in at Carnie Smith Stadium in Pittsburg, Kansas.

Schedule

References

Pittsburg State
Pittsburg State Gorillas football seasons
NCAA Division II Football Champions
Mid-America Intercollegiate Athletics Association football champion seasons
Pittsburg State Gorillas football